The Man from the Rio Grande is a 1943 American Western film directed by Howard Bretherton and written by Norman S. Hall. The film stars Don "Red" Barry, Wally Vernon, Twinkle Watts, Harry Cording, Nancy Gay and Kirk Alyn. The film was released on October 18, 1943, by Republic Pictures.

Plot

Cast  
Don "Red" Barry as Lee Grant
Wally Vernon as Jimpson Simpson
Twinkle Watts as Twinkle Watts
Harry Cording as John King
Nancy Gay as Doris King
Kirk Alyn as Editor Tom Traynor
Paul Scardon as Hanlon
Roy Barcroft as Henchman Ace Holden
Kenne Duncan as Henchman
Jack Kirk as Henchman Curly
Kansas Moehring as Henchman Art

References

External links
 

1943 films
American Western (genre) films
1943 Western (genre) films
Republic Pictures films
Films directed by Howard Bretherton
American black-and-white films
1940s English-language films
1940s American films